The Club Omnisports de Korhogo (CO Korhogo) is an Ivorian football club based in Korhogo. Currently, the club plays in Ivory Coast's Premier Division.

Current squad
As of July 2009

Football clubs in Ivory Coast
Sport in Savanes District
Korhogo